Novobusino is a rural locality (a selo) in Yesiplevskoye Rural Settlement, Kolchuginsky District, Vladimir Oblast, Russia. The population was 363 as of 2010. There are 9 streets.

Geography 
Novobusino is located 21 km east of Kolchugino (the district's administrative centre) by road. Petrushino is the nearest rural locality.

References 

Rural localities in Kolchuginsky District